Elections in the Republic of India in 1978 included elections to seven state legislative assemblies.

Legislative Assembly elections

Andhra Pradesh

Arunachal Pradesh

Assam

Karnataka

|- align=center
!style="background-color:#E9E9E9" class="unsortable"|
!style="background-color:#E9E9E9" align=center|Political Party
!style="background-color:#E9E9E9" |Contestants
!style="background-color:#E9E9E9" |Seats won
!style="background-color:#E9E9E9" |Seat change
!style="background-color:#E9E9E9" |Number of votes
!style="background-color:#E9E9E9" |Vote share
!style="background-color:#E9E9E9" |Net change
|- style="background: #90EE90;"
| 
|align="left"|Indian National Congress (Indira)||214||149||||5,543,756||44.25%||
|-
| 
|align="left"|Janata Party||222||59||||4,754,114||37.95%||
|-
| 
|align="left"|Communist Party of India||6||3||||148,567||1.19%||
|-
| 
|align="left"|Indian National Congress||212||2||||1,001,553||7.99%||
|-
| 
|align="left"|Republican Party of India||3||1||||22,443||0.18%||
|-
| 
|align="left"|Independents||||10|| 10||940,677||7.51%||N/A
|-
|
|align="left"|Total||||224||||'''||||
|-
|}

Maharashtra

|- align=center
!style="background-color:#E9E9E9" class="unsortable"|
!style="background-color:#E9E9E9" align=center|Political Party
!style="background-color:#E9E9E9" |No. of candidates
!style="background-color:#E9E9E9" |No. of elected
!style="background-color:#E9E9E9" |Number of Votes
!style="background-color:#E9E9E9" |% of Votes
!style="background-color:#E9E9E9" |Seat change
|-
| 
|align="left"|Janata Party||215||99||5,701,399||27.99%|| 99
|-
| 
|align="left"|Indian National Congress||259||69||5,159,828||25.33%|| 159
|-
| 
|align="left"|Indian National Congress (Indira)||203||62||3,735,308||18.34%|| 62
|-
| 
|align="left"|Peasants and Workers Party of India||88||13||1,129,172||5.54%|| 6
|-
| 
|align="left"|Communist Party of India (Marxist)||12||9||345,008||1.69%|| 8
|-
| 
|align="left"|All India Forward Bloc||6||3||166,497||0.82%|| 1
|-
| 
|align="left"|Republican Party of India||25||2||215,487||1.06%||
|-
| 
|align="left"|Republican Party of India (Khobragade)||23||2||287,533||1.41%|| 2
|-
| 
|align="left"|Communist Party of India||48||1||301,056||1.48%|| 1
|-
| 
|align="left"|Independents||894||28||2,864,023||14.06%|| 5
|-
|
|align="left"|Total'''||1819||288||20,367,221||100%||
|-
|}

Meghalaya

 The HSPDP won 8 seats in the 1972 election, but the party's representatives were recorded as independents at the time of that election.

Two candidates from the PDIC were elected, but the party had not obtained registration in time for the election; the party's representatives were recorded as independents in the official results.

Mizoram

References

External links
 

1978 elections in India
India
1978 in India
Elections in India by year